Jonas Meiser (born 3 January 1999) is a German footballer who plays as a forward for TSG Balingen.

References

External links
 
 

1999 births
People from Böblingen
Sportspeople from Stuttgart (region)
Footballers from Baden-Württemberg
21st-century German people
Living people
German footballers
Association football forwards
Stuttgarter Kickers players
SG Sonnenhof Großaspach players
TSG Balingen players
3. Liga players
Regionalliga players